Chris McNeill (20 November 1954 – 5 February 2011) was an American ski jumper who competed in the 1980 Winter Olympics.

References

1954 births
2011 deaths
American male ski jumpers
Olympic ski jumpers of the United States
Ski jumpers at the 1980 Winter Olympics